William Darling may refer to:

 William Augustus Darling (1817–1895),  American politician
 William S. Darling (1882–1964), Hungarian-born art director
 William Darling (politician) (1885–1962), UK politician
 William Scott Darling (1898–1951), Canadian-American scriptwriter
 William Lafayette Darling (1856–1938), American consulting engineer